Blood of the Innocent (also known as Beyond Forgiveness) is a 1994 American-Polish direct-to-video film directed by Bob Misiorowski and starring Thomas Ian Griffith, John Rhys-Davies, Rutger Hauer, Artur Zmijewski and Bozena Szymanska.

Premise
A Chicago cop goes to Poland to get the hoods who killed his brother. He soon discovers that his brother was killed by the Russian Mafia. Who are killing local peasants and selling their organs on the black market.

Cast
 Thomas Ian Griffith as Detective Frank Wusharsky
 John Rhys-Davies as Captain Shmuda
 Rutger Hauer as Dr. Lem
 Artur Zmijewski as Detective Marty Wusharsky
 Bozena Szymanska as Patty
 Aleksander Wysocki as 'Scarface'
 Jan Prochyra as Zelepukhin
 Jerry Flynn as FBI Agent Reed
 Marcin Szpil as Sasha
 Ilona Kucinska as Sasha's Mother
 Dominika Ostalowska as Sonia
 Andrzej Zielinski as Bjelski
 Stanislaw Brejdygant as Morszytn
 Joanna Trzepiecinska as Anna
 Hanna Dunowska as Dr. Lem's Assistant
 Jerzy Karaszkiewicz as Stan, The Bartender
 Leon Niemczyk as Polish Priest
 Witold Debicki as Polish Bakery Owner

Reception
Website Moria.co gave the film two stars and concluded: "Beyond Forgiveness is routine in most regards, although has some occasional points that make it interesting watching. One of these is that it the filmmakers have actually gone on location and shot in Poland. The shooting around the various castles and markets adds something picturesque and undeniably different to the standard American locations. Misiorowski at least gives a passably credibility to the situation. The plot is not great but the culture clash aspect is effectively conveyed"

References

External links
 
 
 Blood of the Innocent at Moviefone
 Blood of the Innocent at Moria.co

1995 films
American thriller films
Polish thriller films
1990s English-language films
1990s American films